John Joseph Coleman (born 1935) is an Irish born former greyhound trainer. He was twice British champion trainer and was chairman of the Professional Trainers' Association for over 25 years.

Career
Coleman came to Britain from Cork in 1959 and started working for John Bassett at Clapton Stadium. He then secured the lease of the Chantilly Kennels owned by Jimmy Clubb and took out a private trainers licence in May 1966.

He was appointed as a contracted trainer to Romford Greyhound Stadium in 1968 and established a strong kennel of greyhounds and owners. His first big race success was Ace of Trumps who won the 1969 Scurry Gold Cup. In 1972 he switched from Romford to Wembley and was Champion Trainer in 1974. In 1982 he reached the final of the 1982 English Greyhound Derby for the first time.

He remained at Wembley until 1989 before taking a position at the leading track Walthamstow. During the same year he finished runner-up in the 1989 English Greyhound Derby.

Further final appearances came in 1993, 1996 and 1998 and in between he was Champion Trainer for the second time in 1995, a year that also saw him secure the Trainers Championship for the second successive year.

In 2008 Walthamstow closed and Coleman retired three years later in 2011, he was based for most of his career at the Claverhambury Kennels in Waltham Abbey. The one trophy that eluded him was the English Greyhound Derby.

Awards
He is twice winner of the Greyhound Trainer of the Year in 1974 and 1995.

References 

British greyhound racing trainers
Irish greyhound racing trainers
1935 births
Living people